Trnovo ob Soči ( or ) is a village on the right bank of the Soča River in the Municipality of Kobarid in the Littoral region of Slovenia.

Name
The name of the settlement was changed from Trnovo to Trnovo ob Soči in 1955.

Church

The church in the settlement is dedicated to the Holy Trinity. A church at the site was built in 1744, but was destroyed during the First World War. It was rebuilt in 1942. The Baroque altar in the church dates from 1783.

References

External links

Trnovo ob Soči on Geopedia

Populated places in the Municipality of Kobarid